Pietro Carpegna or Petrus de Carpinea (1592 – 19 June 1630) was a Roman Catholic prelate who served as Bishop of Gubbio (1628–1630).

Biography
Pietro Carpegna was born in Scaolini, Italy in 1592.
On 11 December 1628, he was appointed during the papacy of Pope Urban VIII as Bishop of Gubbio.
On 6 January 1629, he was consecrated bishop by Antonio Marcello Barberini, Cardinal-Priest of Sant'Onofrio, serving as co-consecrators. 
He served as Bishop of Gubbio until his death on 19 June 1630.

References

17th-century Italian Roman Catholic bishops
Bishops appointed by Pope Urban VIII
1592 births
1630 deaths